The 1974 Milwaukee Panthers football team represented the University of Wisconsin–Milwaukee as an independent during the 1974 NCAA Division II football season. Led by second-year head coach Glenn Brady, Milwaukee compiled a record of 4–6. The Panthers offense scored 208 points while the defense allowed 170 points.

Schedule

References

Milwaukee
Milwaukee Panthers football seasons
Milwaukee Panthers football